Arbiter is the fifth studio album by American post-hardcore band Hopesfall. The album, the band's first since 2007's Magnetic North, was released on July 13, 2018 through Graphic Nature / Equal Vision Records.

Background and release
Shortly after the release of Magnetic North in May 2007, every member of Hopesfall left the band, with only vocalist Jay Forrest remaining. Around the same time, Jay Forrest, in an interview with Thrash Magazine, said the record label, Trustkill Records, altered the album's track listing without the band's knowledge. Cory Seals (guitar), Robert DeLauro (bass), Paul Cadena (guitar), and Joey Manizone (drums) toured in support of the album with Forrest. After the tour's completion, in September 2007 Forrest announced that the band would be changing their name, but these plans never came to fruition. Hopesfall  announced their breakup in January 2008 after all of the replacement members left the band.

After the band's breakup, former drummer Jason Trabue accused former label Trustkill Records of withholding royalties and providing the band with insufficient financial support and promotion.

Hopesfall briefly reunited in 2011 with Doug Venable on vocals, Joshua Brigham and Ryan Parrish on guitar, Pat Aldrich on bass, and Adam Morgan on drums. The band played two shows, one in Winston-Salem, North Carolina and one in Charlotte, North Carolina, performing songs from The Frailty of Words, No Wings to Speak Of and The Satellite Years.

The band reunited in 2016, signing to Equal Vision Records and re-issued The Satellite Years, A Types and Magnetic North on vinyl. "H.A. Wallace Space Academy", the group's first new song in 11 years, was released on April 11, 2018 and announced a new album, named Arbiter, would be released on July 13. The album's name, Arbiter, was originally planned to be the new name for the band until Equal Vision suggested they stick with the "Hopesfall" name. The album's second single, "Tunguska", was released on June 12. Third single, "Faint Object Camera", was released on June 28; the song was named after the camera of the same name that was installed on the Hubble Space Telescope from 1990 to 2002. "Faint Object Camera" was included in Alternative Press'''s list of "10 New Songs You Need to Hear This Week" on June 29, 2018.

A music video for "Bradley Fighting Vehicle" was released on August 9 and features clips from the band's performances at the St. Vitus Bar in Brooklyn.

Reception

Upon its release, Arbiter'' has received highly positive reviews from critics.

Jeannie Blue of Cryptic Rock praised the album, favorably comparing the song "I Catapult" to the Hum song "Stars". Blue said the album "proudly carries the flag for the band's signature sound; oft muddy tones, gritty vocals, and always thoughtful lyrics and anchor a collection that is reminiscent of a better time" that is "steeped in melodic hardcore", but is "something much more." Luke Spencer of Music Existence also gave the album a positive review, commending the album's riffs and melody and the band's ability to mix nostalgic sounds with new ones.

Track listing

Charts

Personnel
 Jay Forrest – lead vocals
 Joshua Brigham – guitar
 Dustin Nadler – guitar
 Chad Waldrup – bass, backing vocals
 Adam Morgan – drums

References

Hopesfall albums
Equal Vision Records albums
2018 albums